"The Ladies' Bras" is a song by Jonny Trunk and Wisbey which reached number 27 in the UK Singles Chart in September 2007. At 36 seconds, it is the shortest song ever to enter the chart, taking the record just a few weeks after the song "Spider Pig" (1 minute, 4 seconds), from the 2007 film The Simpsons Movie had taken it. Before that, the shortest charting single had been Liam Lynch's 2002 "United States of Whatever" (1 minutes, 26 seconds).

"The Ladies' Bras" became popular after it was played on Danny Baker's All Day Breakfast Show podcast show, reaching number 70 on the UK Singles Chart with 1,644 sales and no national airplay. It was later picked up by Scott Mills on BBC Radio 1, who campaigned to get it in the charts by asking guests on his show including McFly and Dannii Minogue to sing it live on air. Originally available on the Trunk Records 10th anniversary compilation CD Now We Are 10, the track was also available for download on services such as iTunes and Wippit and had no official music video.

The melody is "The Gonk" from George Romero's 1978 Dawn of the Dead soundtrack, as played in the supermarket scenes.

References

External links
 

2007 singles
Trunk Records singles
2007 songs